Jews of Iran is a 2005 documentary film by Iranian-Dutch  filmmaker Ramin Farahani.  The film examines the lives of Persian Jews living in Iran's predominately Islamic society. Although they face discrimination, they choose to remain in their homes rather than leave the country.

The documentary was the first film to cover this subject, capturing both friendships among Muslims and Jews and the prejudices against the Jewish minority. Farahani states that Jews of Iran is meant to "help westerners correct their image" of the Middle East and allow them to "see the nuances" within the culture.

Background 
Although Jews have lived in Iran for 2,700 years, the 1979 Iranian Revolution pressured most Jews to leave the country. In modern Iran, rampant antisemitism continues to threaten the remaining citizens.

Synopsis

The film uses Middle Eastern music in its backgorund. It offers shots of century-old architecture as the documentary travels through Tehran, Isfahan, and Shiraz. 

A broad range of Jewish Iranians are interviewed, from an old woman in a hospital to a computer science student. Muslim students are also interviewed; they explain they have no friends due to Israeli politics or because Jews "don't mix" with Iranian Muslims.  

The film also finds examples of religious tolerance, such as two women, one Jewish and the other Muslim, who have been friends since college. Their sons subsequently also became friends.

In Isfahan, Jewish artist Suleiman Sassoon explains how his work is strongly influenced by Iranian art and Islamic architecture.  Pointing to his paintings, he explains how he naturally blends religious motifs, such as the Ten Commandments and David's prayer, with a traditional Iranian art style.

Finally, Farahani travels to Shiraz, where thirteen Jews have been accused of espionage.  The evidence against them is circumstantial and built on extorted confessions, leading to the belief that the initial accusations were concocted.  Nonetheless, they face death sentences, receiving 2-9 year prison terms.

Reception
In an interview, Farahani said, "The reaction of Jews and Iranians outside was mainly emotional because they got more feeling with the things we show in the film...I heard of wet eyes, nostalgic feelings for missing roots etc." 

Harif of The Association of Jews from the Middle East and North Africa wrote that the film gives, "A rare glimpse into the lives of some of the 25,000 Jews still in Iran...and gives a remarkable insight into the official discrimination suffered by the Jews under the Islamic regime."

Similar movies
In Search of Happiness
Reconstruction
Next Year in Argentina
Queen of the Mountain

See also

History of the Jews in Iran
International Conference to Review the Global Vision of the Holocaust
International Holocaust Cartoon Competition
Iran–Israel relations
Mahmoud Ahmadinejad and Israel
Persian Jews
Shiraz blood libel

References

External links
 "Jews of Iran" on director's homepage: Interviews and articles listed
DVD of "Jews of Iran" on director's weblog
Shohreh Jandaghian's interview with Ramin Farahani
Jewish World interview with Ramin Farahani
Banned Documentary Sparks Oxford Discussion on Iranian Jews

2005 films
Dutch documentary films
Jews and Judaism in Persia and Iran
Documentary films about Jews and Judaism
Documentary films about Iran
2005 documentary films